Edward F. O'Dwyer (1860–1922) was Chief Justice of the New York City court and president of the National Democratic Club.

References

American judges
1860 births
1922 deaths